The 1955 Belgian Grand Prix was a Formula One motor race held at Spa-Francorchamps on June 5, 1955. It was race 4 of 7 in the 1955 World Championship of Drivers. The 36-lap race was won by Mercedes driver Juan Manuel Fangio after he started from second position. His teammate Stirling Moss finished second and Ferrari driver Nino Farina came in third.

Race report 

Harry Schell set a grid time but his car was driven by teammate Maurice Trintignant. This was the easiest of wins for Mercedes. With the absence of Lancia, there was very little competition. Fangio disappeared into the distance with Moss tracking him round. Private entrant Eugenio Castellotti retired after 16 laps, Jean Behra crashed and Hawthorn's Vanwall had an oil leak.
The domination of the silver cars was such that they came in over 2 minutes ahead of Farina in third place after he had lost a great deal of time attempting unsuccessfully to pass Castellotti.

Classification

Qualifying

Race

Notes
 – Includes 1 point for fastest lap

Shared drive 
 Car #24: Roberto Mieres (10 laps) and Jean Behra (25 laps). They shared the 2 points for fifth place.

Championship standings after the race 
Drivers' Championship standings

Note: Only the top five positions are included. Constructors' Championship not introduced until 1958.

References

External links
Steve Small - The Grand Prix Who's Who, 1996
Sheldon and Rabagliati - A Record of Grand Prix and Voiturette Racing, Volume 6, 1954-1959, 1987
James Allen on F1 - video of 1955 event 
Half-hour HiDef copy of contemporary film of the 1955 GP

Belgian Grand Prix
Belgian Grand Prix
Grand Prix
June 1955 sports events in Europe